In mathematics — specifically, in stochastic analysis — the infinitesimal generator of a Feller process (i.e. a continuous-time Markov process satisfying certain regularity conditions) is a Fourier multiplier operator that encodes a great deal of information about the process. The generator is used in evolution equations such as the Kolmogorov backward equation (which describes the evolution of statistics of the process); its L2 Hermitian adjoint is used in evolution equations such as the Fokker–Planck equation (which describes the evolution of the probability density functions of the process).

Definition

General case 

For a Feller process  with Feller semigroup   and state space  we define the generator  by

,
, for any .
In general, it is not easy to describe the domain of the Feller generator but it is always closed and densely defined. If  is -valued and  contains the test functions (compactly supported smooth functions) then
,

Lévy processes 
The generator of Lévy semigroup is of the form

If we define

for  then the generator can be written as

where  denotes the Fourier transform. So the generator of a Lévy process (or semigroup) is a Fourier multiplier operator with symbol .

Stochastic differential equations driven by Lévy processes 
Let  be a Lévy process with symbol  (see above). Let  be locally Lipschitz and bounded. The solution of the SDE  exists for each deterministic initial condition  and yields a Feller process with symbol 

Note that in general, the solution of an SDE driven by a Feller process which is not Lévy might fail to be Feller or even Markovian.

As a simple example consider  with a Brownian motion driving noise. If we assume  are Lipschitz and of linear growth, then for each deterministic initial condition there exists a unique solution, which is Feller with symbol

Generators of some common processes

 For finite-state continuous time Markov chains the generator may be expressed as a transition rate matrix
 The two-dimensional process  satisfying:

 where  is a one-dimensional Brownian motion, can be thought of as the graph of that Brownian motion, and has generator:

 Similarly, the graph of the Ornstein–Uhlenbeck process has generator:

See also 

Dynkin's formula

References

 (See Chapter 9)
  (See Section 7.3)

Stochastic differential equations